is a Japanese photographer known widely for his erotic work. He has also worked in advertising, contributing his photographs to various Japanese companies' commercial ads, such as those by Fujitsu and Nippon Oil.

Biography 
Excerpts from Aida's books Romansu, Romansu Part 2, and Hi ga gensou jipangu ~ Ten no maki, showing nude adult women, were featured in the November 1983 issue of the French photography magazine Photo Reporter, including on the cover. The June 1986 issue of the French edition of Photo magazine, which had a special focus on Japan, contained a cover photo by Aida showing three young nude Japanese women. His photos were also published during the 1980s in the Italian, German, and Spanish editions of Photo and in France's Newlook magazine, among others.

During the 1990s, Aida made erotic photographs of teenage models both over and under 18 years of age. Among his best known models from this period are Kaoru from Japan and many of his subjects from Sweden. These photographs are generally regarded as tasteful and high in quality. Many of them show partial or full nudity.

Aida photographed Naomi Morinaga, an actress in 1984's Uchuu Keiji Shaider, for a 1994 book titled W Face.

In the 2000s (decade), he photographed milder erotic pictures of very young models — something quite acceptable in Japan, but not viewed favorably in the west. These later works are not nude photographs, but images of models in swim wear, casual clothing, and school uniforms. The models range in age from 10 to 17. There is a comfortable attitude toward lolita among Japanese men, making these photos high-selling items in both regular and e-book formats.

Aida has also released several videos and DVDs of both nude and non-nude subjects (many are the same models who posed for his still photography).

He is known for his work with Japanese idol Mao Kobayashi. She has appeared in several photo books and DVDs, has a website, and has made several television appearances. Aida has photographed Mao in kimono, school uniform, swim wear, and other costumes.

Other popular models under 15 Aida has photographed include Saaya Irie (12), Asami Doi (13), Sari Kiri (13), Azusa Hibino (14), and Yuka Yamaguchi (14).

Selected Books by Garo Aida
Shōjo. Japan: Toen Mook, 1981
Romansu. Tokyo, Japan: Take Shobo, 1981
Romansu Part 2. Tokyo, Japan: Take Shobo, 1982
Hi ga gensou jipangu ~ Ten no maki. Japan: Bamboo Mook, 1982
W Face. Tokyo, Japan: Wanibooks, 1994 - 
Sweden Sex-Ton. Tokyo, Japan: Kaiohsha, 1994 - 
Sweden Sex-Ton 2. Tokyo, Japan: Kaiohsha, 1995 - 
Imouto. Tokyo, Japan: Kaiohsha, 1998 - 
The Photography of Alice in Wonderland. Japan: Bauhaus, 1999
Kaoru Seventeen. Tokyo, Japan: Bunkasha, 1999 - 
Kaoru 2. Tokyo, Japan: Bunkasha, 2000 - 
Sotsugyou Sashin - Kaoru Private Collection. Tokyo, Japan: Bunkasha, 2002 - 
The European Fairy Tale. Tokyo, Japan: Bunkasha, 2003 - 
Saaya 11 sai. Tokyo, Japan: Bunkasha, 2005 - 
Mao 13 sai ~Houjun~. Tokyo, Japan: Bunkasha, 2006 - 
Mao 14 sai ~Oto~. Tokyo, Japan: Bunkasha, 2006 -

Magazine Pictorials by Garo Aida
Photo (French edition), March 1983 (#186) - 12 pages, "En photos les estampes japonaises"
Photo Hi Fi Italiana, May 1983 (#95) - "Le stampe giapponesi in fotografia"
Photo Reporter, November 1983 (#61)
Newlook, March 1984 (#7) - "Femmes tatouées"

External links
Official web site

Japanese erotic photographers
Japanese photographers
Living people
1949 births